2010 in swimming documents the highlights of competitive international swimming during 2010.

Major events

World
15–19 August: Swimming at the 2010 Summer Youth Olympics in Singapore
18–22 August: 2010 Pan Pacific Swimming Championships, Irvine, California, USA
4–13 October: Swimming at the 2010 Commonwealth Games in Delhi, India
15–19 December: FINA World Swimming Championships (25 m) in Dubai, United Arab Emirates

Regional
29 January–8 February: Swimming at the 2010 South Asian Games in Dhaka, Bangladesh
18–23 July: Swimming at the 2010 Central American and Caribbean Games, Mayaguez, Puerto Rico
4–16 August: 2010 European Aquatics Championships in Budapest, Hungary
13–29 September: 2010 African Swimming Championships
12–27 November: Swimming at the 2010 Asian Games in Guangzhou, China
25–28 November: 2010 European Short Course Swimming Championships in Eindhoven, Netherlands

Other events

National championships
Long course

Short course

Other major meets
Mare Nostrum 2010:
5–6 June: Meeting International de Natation de Monte-Carlo in Monte Carlo, Monaco
9–10 June: Trofeo Ciudad de Barcelona in Barcelona, Spain
12–13 June: Meeting Arena de Canet en Roussillon in Canet, France

Paralympic swimming
15–21 August: 2010 IPC Swimming World Championships in Eindhoven, Netherlands
12–19 December: 2010 Asian Para Games in Guangzhou, China

References

 
Swimming by year